Aung Myint Tun (born 3 May 1990) is a footballer from Burma, and a midfielder for the Myanmar national football team.

He currently plays for Magwe in Myanmar National League.

References

1990 births
Living people
Burmese footballers
Ayeyawady United F.C. players
Magway FC players
Myanmar international footballers
People from Maungdaw
Association football forwards